
Year 1575 (MDLXXV)  was a common year starting on Saturday (link will display the full calendar) of the Julian calendar.

Events 
 January–June 
 January 21 – Queen Elizabeth I of England grants a monopoly on producing printed sheet music, to Thomas Tallis and William Byrd.
 February 8 – William I of Orange founds Leiden University.
 February 13 – Henry III of France is crowned at Reims.
 February 14 – Henry III of France marries Louise de Lorraine-Vaudémont.
 March 3 – Battle of Tukaroi: The Mughal Empire decisively defeats the Karrani dynasty of Bengal.
 June 24 – William I of Orange marries Charlotte of Bourbon.
 June 28 – Battle of Nagashino: Oda Nobunaga defeats Takeda Katsuyori in Japan's first modern battle.

 July–December 
 July 7 – Raid of the Redeswire: Sir John Carmichael defeats Sir John Forster, in the last battle between England and Scotland.
 July 26 – Edmund Grindal succeeds Matthew Parker as Archbishop of Canterbury.
 August 5 – Henry Sidney is appointed Lord Lieutenant of Ireland.
 October 10 – Battle of Dormans: Catholic forces under Henry I, Duke of Guise defeat the Protestants, capturing Philippe de Mornay among others.
 October 22 – The city of Villa de la Asunción (today Aguascalientes) is founded in New Spain, by permission from Philip II of Spain. 
 December 16 – An earthquake hits Valdivia.

 Date unknown 
 Russians occupy Pernau in western Estonia, and the fortress of Weissenstein.
 The seat of the Audiencia Real in Chile moves from Concepción to Santiago.
 Abraham Ortelius becomes a geographer to Philip II of Spain.
 The bubonic plague decimates Venice.
 Captains of vessels flying the Spanish flag are legally required to maintain a logbook.

Births 

 January – Elizabeth Cecil, 16th Baroness de Ros (d. 1591)
 January 22 – Louis III, Cardinal of Guise (d. 1621)
 c. February 3 – Bernard of Wąbrzeźno, Polish Catholic priest and Benedictine monk (d. 1603)
 February 4 – Pierre de Bérulle, French cardinal and statesman (d. 1629)
 February 15 – Louis Gunther of Nassau, Count of Nassau-Katzenelnbogen (d. 1604)
 February 16 – Richard Carpenter, English priest and theologian (d. 1625)
 February 21 – Marten Pepijn, Flemish painter (d. 1643)
 February 27
 John Adolf, Duke of Holstein-Gottorp (1590–1616) (d. 1616)
 Anna of Holstein-Gottorp, countess consort of East Frisia (d. 1610)
 April 18 – Frederick Magnus, Count of Erbach-Fürstenau (1606–1618) (d. 1618)
 April 21 – Francesco Molin, Doge of Venice (d. 1655)
 April 26 – Marie de' Medici, queen of Henry IV of France (d. 1642)
 May 20 – Robert Heath, English judge and politician (d. 1649)
 May 30 – Diego Salcedo, Spanish bishop (d. 1644)
 June 15 – Lelio Biscia, Italian Catholic cardinal (d. 1638)
 June 24 – William Petre, 2nd Baron Petre, English peer and MP (d. 1637)
 June 26 – Anne Catherine of Brandenburg (d. 1612)
 July 2 – Elizabeth de Vere, Countess of Derby (d. 1627)
 July 11 – Thomas Berkeley, English politician (d. 1611)
 July 14 – Augustus, Prince of Anhalt-Plötzkau, German prince (d. 1653)
 July 28 – Fernando de Valdés y Llanos, Spanish Catholic archbishop (d. 1639)
 July 31 – Simon Steward, English politician (d. 1632)
 August 14 – Robert Hayman, English-born poet (d. 1629)
 August 15 – Diego, Prince of Asturias, Portuguese prince (d. 1582)
 August 18 – Countess Palatine Anna Maria of Neuburg, Duchess of Saxe-Altenburg (d. 1643)
 August 24 – William Burton, British antiquarian (d. 1645)
 November 4 – Guido Reni, Italian painter (d. 1642)
 November 26 – John Augustus, Count Palatine of Lützelstein, German count (d. 1611)
 December 4 – The Nun of Monza, Italian nun (d. 1650)
 December 18 – Michelagnolo Galilei, Italian lutenist and composer (d. 1631)
 date unknown
 Jakob Böhme, German mystic (d. 1624)
 David Calderwood, Scottish divine and historian (d. 1650)
 Concino Concini, 3rd Prime Minister of France (d. 1617)
 Anna Kostka, Polish noblewoman (d. 1635)
 Lionel Cranfield, 1st Earl of Middlesex, successful London merchant (d. 1645)
 William Parker, 4th Baron Monteagle (d. 1622)
 Arbella Stuart, Duchess of Somerset (d. 1615)
 Cyril Tourneur, English dramatist (d. 1626)
 Rory O'Donnell, 1st Earl of Tyrconnell (d. 1608)
 probable
 Vittoria Aleotti, Italian composer (d. c. 1620)
 Giambattista Basile, Italian poet (d. 1632)
 Edmund Bolton, English historian and poet (d. 1633)
 Clemente Tabone, Maltese landowner and militia member (d. 1665)

Deaths 

 January 4 – Sidonie of Saxony, Duchess of Brunswick-Calenberg (b. 1518)
 January 14 – Barbara Uthmann, German businessperson (b. 1514)
 January 22 – James Hamilton, Duke of Châtellerault (b. 1516)
 January 29 – Hernando de Aragón, Spanish Roman Catholic archbishop (b. 1498)
 February 9 – Karl Friedrich of Jülich-Cleves-Berg, heir apparent of Jülich-Cleves-Berg (b. 1555)
 February 20 – Maria of Jever, last ruler of the Lordship of Jever (b. 1500)
 February 21 – Claude of Valois, Duchess consort of Lorraine and French princess (b. 1547)
 March 11 – Matthias Flacius, Croatian Protestant reformer (b. 1520)
 March 15 – Annibale Padovano, Italian composer and organist (b. 1527)
 March 17 – Georg Cracow, German lawyer and politician (b. 1525)
 March 24 – Yosef Karo, Spanish-born Jewish rabbi. Author of the book "Shulchan Aruch" (b. 1488)
 May 17 – Matthew Parker, English Roman Catholic archbishop (b. 1504)
 May 28 – Sophia Jagiellon, Duchess of Brunswick-Lüneburg (b. 1522)
 June 3 – Francisco de Ibarra, Spanish explorer and colonial governor in Mexico (b. c. 1539)
 June 7 – Sir George Heron, English politician
 June 28 – Yonekura Shigetsugu, Japanese samurai
 June 29
 Baba Nobuharu, Japanese samurai
 Hara Masatane, Japanese samurai (b. 1531)
 Naito Masatoyo, Japanese samurai (b. 1522)
 Sanada Nobutsuna, Japanese samurai (b. 1537)
 Takeda Nobuzane, Japanese daimyō
 Yamagata Masakage, Japanese samurai (b. 1524)
 July 14 – Richard Taverner, English Bible translator (b. 1505)
 July 29 – Jon Simonssøn, Norwegian humanist (b. 1512)
 August 2 – Christopher II, Margrave of Baden-Rodemachern (b. 1537)
 September 17 – Heinrich Bullinger, Swiss religious reformer (b. 1504)
 September 24 – Anna of Oldenburg, Regent of East Frisia (b. 1501)
 October 17 – Gaspar Cervantes de Gaeta, Spanish Roman Catholic cardinal (b. 1511)
 October 20 – Kaspar Eberhard, German theologian (b. 1523)
 October 24 – Peder Oxe, Danish finance minister (b. 1520)
 November 2 – Sabina of Brandenburg-Ansbach, German princess (b. 1529)
 December 1 – Diego Andrada de Payva, Portuguese theologian (b. 1528)
 December 23 – Akiyama Nobutomo, Japanese retainer (b. 1531)
 December 31 – Pierino Belli, Italian soldier and jurist (b. 1502)
 date unknown
 Constantio Varoli, Italian anatomist (b. 1543)
 Isabel de Josa, Catalan writer (b. 1508)

In fiction 
 The conclusion of the events of the film Kagemusha by Akira Kurosawa takes place in this year.

References